Hispaniola Airways was an airline from the Dominican Republic, that operated flights to Europe and the United  States out of its base at Puerto Plata Airport. The company was founded in 1981 and disestablished in 2000.  Hispaniola operated Boeing 707, Boeing 720, Douglas DC-8 and Sud Aviation Caravelle jetliners.

Destinations

Hispaniola Airways offered scheduled passenger flights to the following destinations:

 Puerto Plata - Puerto Plata La Union Airport  base

 Madrid - Barajas International Airport

 London - London Heathrow Airport

 Miami - Miami International Airport
 New York City - John F. Kennedy International Airport

Incidents
On 16 December 1981 at 12:16 local time, a Hispaniola Airways Boeing 707 (registered HI-384HA) was damaged beyond repair when its right main landing gear collapsed upon landing at Miami International Airport. The aircraft had been on a positioning flight from Puerto Plata with only five crew members on board, none of which was severely injured.

References

Defunct airlines of the Dominican Republic
Airlines established in 1981
Airlines disestablished in 2000